The 1943 All-Big Ten Conference football team consists of American football players selected to the All-Big Ten Conference teams selected by the Associated Press (AP) and United Press (UP) for the 1943 Big Ten Conference football season.

All Big-Ten selections

Ends
 Herb Hein, Northwestern (AP-1; UP-1)
 Pete Pihos, Indiana (AP-1; UP-1)
 Frank Bauman, Purdue (AP-2; UP-2)
 Rudy Smeja, Michigan (AP-2)
 Barbour, Iowa (UP-2)

Tackles
 Paul A. Mitchell, Minnesota (AP-1; UP-1)
 Bill Willis, Ohio State (AP-1; UP-1)
 Merv Pregulman, Michigan (AP-2; UP-2)
 Genis, Purdue (UP-2)
 Mike Kasap, Purdue (AP-2)

Guards
 Dick Barwegan, Purdue (AP-1; UP-1)
 Alex Agase, Purdue (AP-1; UP-1)
 Alex Kapter, Northwestern (AP-2; UP-2)
 J. C. Coffee, Indiana (UP-2)
 Robert Liddy, Iowa (AP-2)

Centers
 Fred Negus, Michigan (AP-1; UP-1)
 John Tavener, Indiana (AP-2; UP-2)

Quarterbacks
 Bob Hoernschemeyer, Indiana (AP-1; UP-1 [halfback])
 Bob Wiese, Michigan (AP-2; UP-1)
 Jack Wink, Michigan (UP-2)

Halfbacks
 Otto Graham, Northwestern (AP-1; UP-1)
 Tony Butkovich, Purdue (AP-1; UP-2 [fullback])
 Elroy Hirsch, Michigan (AP-2; UP-2)
 Ernie Parks, Ohio State (AP-2)
 Bray, Illinois (UP-2)

Fullbacks
 Bill Daley, Michigan (AP-1, UP-1)
 Don Buffmire, Northwestern (AP-2)

Key

AP = Associated Press, chosen by conference coaches

UP = United Press

Bold = Consensus first-team selection of both the AP and UP

See also
1943 College Football All-America Team

References

1943 Big Nine Conference football season
All-Big Ten Conference football teams